Sense and Sensibilia (or On Sense and the Sensible, On Sense and What is Sensed, On Sense Perception; Greek: Περὶ αἰσθήσεως καὶ αἰσθητῶν; Latin: De sensu et sensibilibus, De sensu et sensili, De sensu et sensato) is one of the short treatises by Aristotle that make up the Parva Naturalia.

The English title Sense and Sensibilia adopted by the Revised Oxford Translation repeats the title J. L. Austin chose for his 1962 book Sense and Sensibilia, which in turn incorporated an allusive echo of Jane Austen's title Sense and Sensibility.

Commentaries
 Alexander of Aphrodisias (Greek text)
 Averroes (Latin translation, Venice, 1562, beginning on p. 455 of the PDF file)
 Thomas Aquinas (Latin text (Parma 1866), Latin text (HTML), English translation)
 James of Douai
 G.R.T. Ross, 1906 (Greek text, English translation, and commentary)

Notes

External links

 
On sense and the sensible, translated by J. I. Beare
HTML Greek text: HODOI (with concordance and French translation), Mikros apoplous (with Modern Greek translation and notes)

Works by Aristotle